Delman L. Coates (born January 13, 1973) is an American Christian minister. He is senior pastor of Mt. Ennon Baptist Church, a megachurch located in Clinton, Maryland, since 2004.

Coates is founder of the Our Money Campaign, an economic justice campaign launched in May 2019. He is founder of the Black Church Center for Justice & Equality. Coates is a board member of the National Action Network.

Early life and education 
Coates was born on January 13, 1973, in Richmond, Virginia. He has one sister. Coates obtained his B.A. in Religion in 1995 from Morehouse College and his Master of Divinity from Harvard Divinity School in 1998. He also attended Columbia University, receiving his Master of Philosophy in Religion in 2002 and his Ph.D. in New Testament and Early Christianity in 2006).

Ministry
In 2004, he became senior pastor of Mt. Ennon Baptist Church, a megachurch located in Clinton, Maryland.

Politics 
Maryland House of Delegates member Heather Mizeur named Coates as her running mate in the 2014 race for governor.

Published articles
"And the Bible Says: Methodological Tyranny of Biblical Fundamentalism and Historical Criticism" in Blow the Trumpet in Zion (2004)
 "Towards a Progressive Christian Interpretive Praxis" in The African-American Pulpit (2004)
 "Origen of Alexandria" in Union Seminary Quarterly Review (vol. 59:3-4, 2005)

Coates wrote an essay titled “The New Abolitionism: Monetary Reform and the Future of Civil Rights” which appears in the book Mr. President: Interfaith Perspectives on the Historic Presidency of Barack H. Obama (2017).

References

External links 

 Mt. Ennon Baptist Church
 [Instagram|https://www.instagram.com/iamdelmancoates/]

1973 births
African-American Baptist ministers
Baptist ministers from the United States
People from Clinton, Maryland
Living people
Columbia University alumni
Morehouse College alumni
Harvard Divinity School alumni
Philosophers of religion
Baptists from Maryland
21st-century African-American people
20th-century African-American people